The nursing organization workplace has been identified as one in which workplace bullying occurs quite frequently. It is thought that relational aggression (psychological aspects of bullying such as gossiping and intimidation) are relevant. Relational aggression has been studied amongst girls but rarely amongst adult women. According to a finding, 74% of the nurses, 100% of the anesthetists, and 80% of surgical technologists have experienced or witnessed uncivil behaviors like bullying by nursing faculty. There have been many incidents that have occurred throughout the past couple of years. OSHA, which stands for “Occupational Safety and Health Administration” stated that from 2011 to 2013, the United States healthcare workers experienced  15,000 to 20,000 significant injuries while in the workplace (ECRI, 2017, para. 4). 

Various bullying permutations are possible, such as:

 doctor or management bullying a nurse
 nurse bullying another nurse
 nurse bullying a patient
 patient bullying a nurse
 nurse bullying other healthcare providers

There was a study that was done that showed 25% of registered nurses reporting physical abuse by a patient or their family members while more than 50% of nurses have reported exposure to verbal abuse.  In 2019, there was also a study conducted on the presence of verbal abuse in nursing and this study concluded that 42.9% of nurses were exposed to this. This proves that this is an ongoing concern in the nursing field. As stated before, the statement goes into a more depth explanation of what nurses are dealing with in their everyday work lives. The main problem in the nursing world that is currently trying to be solved is the issue of nurse abuse. Taking care of patients during vulnerable times of their lives can lead to an increase in the risk of workplace violence. This gives us a reason as to why nurses are dealing with violence at work. Years ago this is not an issue that would have been brought up due to people not talking about it.

There was a lot of research done on healthcare workers and the abuse that they are dealing with at work. Across all of the studies in the different articles, studies were taken on how many nurses are dealing with abuse in their everyday lives. Some of the studies lead to the side effects that the nurses deal with due to workplace violence. All studies were done by professional researchers and the data found was based on nurses. Between the articles the researchers all agree that nurse abuse is an issue that needs to be dealt with, so there is no disagreement.

Bullying acts
The following are identified as bullying acts in nursing:Maeve Duggan. PEW Research Center. 2014. "Online Harassment". "http://www.pewinternet.org/2014/10/22/online-harassment/".

Such acts are frequently insidious, continuing over periods of time that may be years. Bullies are often serial bullies. The bullies are invariably aware of the damage they are doing. They undertake such actions basically to gain control and power.

Pariona (2020) talks about how between 60-90 percent of nurses have to deal with physical or verbal abuse at some point in their work-life (p. 1). This just shows people how much nurses deal with abuse daily at work. Whereas, Havaei (2020) mentions that since patients do not know how to express their emotions it might lead to violent and aggressive attacks on their nurses”(p. 2). Not that this is an excuse for patients to get violent towards their nurses, it does explain why it happens in some situations. The patient’s emotions are not an excuse for how they treat their nurses. No nurse should have to go to work worried about being verbally or physically abused.

Causes 
According to various studies, possible causes of bullying may include the following:

 insufficient staff
 stressful situations
 unfavorable condition in a patient
 use of alcohol
 poor enforcement of policies

Incivility
Workplace incivility can have a tremendous impact on the quality of nursing care. This can cause stress on nurses, and can cause them to have job dissatisfaction. Laschinger, Leiter, Day, and Gilin found that among 612 staff nurses, 67.5% had experienced incivility from their supervisors and 77.6% had experienced incivility from their coworkers.  Rude remarks from a patient or family member can distract healthcare professionals and cause them to make mistakes and provide suboptimal healthcare. A study done by Kanitha and Naik found that 91% of nurses who experience workplace incivility are females, and that 77% of nurses have experiences incivility in their workplace.

Bullying of nurses by managers
The bullying of nurses by their managers is called hierarchical violence, wherein a person of power bullies a less powerful person. An example of this would be a manager to a staff nurse. Often, this occurs with the main purpose of disempowering the person in lesser power. Hierarchical violence involves frequent, intentional humiliating and destructive actions toward a person. According to a study done by Ebrahimi, this can include:

 verbal abuse
 humiliation
 excessive criticism
 sarcasm
 intimidation
 denial of access to opportunities
 discouragement

In 2003 the Community Practitioners' and Health Visitors' Association in the UK carried out a survey showing that half of the health visitors, school nurses and community nurses working in the National Health Service (NHS) have been bullied by their managers. One in three of the 563 people questioned said the bullying was so bad they had to take time off work. Constant criticism and humiliation were the most common complaints. Others said they were shouted at or marginalised. During Ebrahimi's study done in 2017, it was found that a majority of nurses, typically new graduate nurses, experience some type of bullying by someone in a greater power of position to them.

Nurses deal with abuse from their leaders in the workplace as well as their patients. When bullying is allowed in the workplace it can lead to workplace burnout and complications between coworkers.

Dealing with abuse 
Dealing with abuse can lead to professionals not wanting to come to work. Researchers have found out that 13% of missed workdays are because of workplace violence and how it could affect the quality of care that the patients are getting. Another major effect of the abuse is that the nurses are getting very burnt out. Burnout occurs by being mentally exhausted and detached with negative attitudes towards work. It has also been found that 1/3 of the nurses that endure some type of mistreatment end up suffering a physical health consequence.

Consequences 
Not only does incivility in nursing has a negative influence on the well-being of staff, the delivery of quality care, and the culture of safety, but also contributes to the nursing faculty shortage. There is an increase in nurses' dissatisfaction in their jobs, which is contributing to the ongoing struggle with nurses leaving faculty positions and taking early retirement. Therefore, it is necessary for all healthcare faculty members to have a clear understanding of the cause and effect of incivility and possible strategies to reduce incivility rate. The possible consequences of workplace violence for nurses includes:

 impacted health: mental, psychological, emotional, physical, and social
 anxiety and/or depression
 loss of appetite
 weight loss/gain
 nausea or vomiting
 insomnia and/or nightmares
 menstrual disturbances
 feelings of shame, helplessness, and/or isolation
 loss of self esteem
 feeling unsafe at work
 shorter employment duration
 reduced work performance
 feeling unsafe
 resentment of higher authority
 injuries

Nurse bullying inventory
In order to further investigate and understand the impact of workplace bullying on the nursing work environment, an inventory was developed to address specific workplace bullying constructs within the nursing context.

Associated terms
Horizontal violence is often the same term used when referring to bullying in nursing. This term describes the appalling behavior shown by colleagues in the nursing field. Such demeaning behavior can make the workplace stressful and unpleasant. Another term associated to bullying in nursing is hierarchical violence. This occurs when a person in a position of power, such as a nurse manager or head nurse, bullies a person in lesser power, such as a staff nurse. Lateral violence occurs when one staff nurse were to harass another staff nurse, with neither of them being in a higher position of power than the other.

Remedial action
Some health organizations are seeking to educate staff and health care team members on how to improve social interactions, proper business etiquette, and foster positive people skills in the work environment. Nurses are entitled to monetary compensation for experiencing bullying.

See also

 Aggression in healthcare
 Bullying in medicine
 Emotional labor
 Patient abuse
 Workplace bullying
 Workplace incivility

References

Further reading

Books

 Fast Facts on Combating Nurse Bullying, Incivility, and Workplace Violence (2018).  
Button SM Bullying of a nursing student: a mixed interpretive study (2007)
 Dellasega C When Nurses Hurt Nurses: Recognizing and Overcoming The Cycles of Bullying (2011)
 Nurses and the experience of bullying at work: a report for the Claire Thomson, Working Women's Centre (Adelaide, S. Aust.), Australian Nursing Federation. S.A. Branch – 1998
 Thompson R "Do No Harm" Applies To Nurses Too! (2012)
 Webb C, Randle J Workplace Bullying in the NHS (2006)

Academic papers

Others

Nursing ethics
Social problems in medicine
Workplace bullying